The Arrows A11 was a Formula One car with which the Arrows team competed in the  and  Formula One seasons, and at the start of the  season (badged as a Footwork).

It was raced to reasonably good effect by Derek Warwick and Eddie Cheever in 1989, Warwick finishing in the top six on five occasions and briefly challenging for victory in the Canadian Grand Prix, and Cheever finishing third in the United States Grand Prix, held in his home town of Phoenix, Arizona. With 13 points, Arrows placed seventh in the Constructors' Championship.

For 1990, the car received minor suspension upgrades and became the A11B, while Italian drivers Michele Alboreto and Alex Caffi replaced Warwick and Cheever. 1990 turned out to be far less successful than 1989, however, as the car failed to qualify seven times, and finished in the top six only once, when Caffi took fifth at an attritional race in Monaco. Caffi was also forced to sit out the United States and Spanish races through injury, Germany's Bernd Schneider deputising on both occasions. The two points from Monaco gave Arrows ninth in the Constructors' Championship.

By the start of 1991, the team had been taken over by the Japanese Footwork concern and renamed accordingly, and had also secured a deal to run Porsche V12 engines, replacing the Fords. However, the team's car for that season, the FA12, had to be redesigned when it was discovered that the large Porsche engine, the 3512, could not fit into it. The team therefore modified the A11B into the A11C to accommodate this engine, and used it in the first two races, as well as at San Marino after Alboreto destroyed his redesigned FA12 during practice. From these five attempts, the ageing car qualified only once (Alboreto in the United States), before being finally retired.

Complete Formula One World Championship results
(key)

References

A11